Christopher Flyn Foerster (born October 12, 1961) is an American football coach who currently serves as the run game coordinator and offensive line coach for the San Francisco 49ers of the National Football League (NFL).  Previously, he worked for the Dolphins as their offensive coordinator in 2004.

Coaching career
Foerster was hired by the San Francisco 49ers on February 15, 2008 as the co-offensive line coach. He assumed the title of offensive line coach in week 8 of the 2008 season.

Prior to joining the 49ers, Foerster spent three years (2005–07) as the offensive line coach and assistant head coach for the Baltimore Ravens. Foerster has also served as the offensive coordinator for the Miami Dolphins (2004), tight ends coach for the Indianapolis Colts (2002–03), offensive line coach for the Tampa Buccaneers (1996–2001) and assistant offensive line/tight ends coach for the Minnesota Vikings (1993–95).

With a total of 34 years coaching experience, Foerster also made an impact in the collegiate ranks, serving as the offensive line coach for the University of Minnesota (1992), assistant offensive line/special teams coach for Stanford (1988–91) and offensive line coach for Colorado State (1983–87). He began his coaching career in 1982 as a graduate assistant at Colorado State after a successful career with the Rams as a center from 1979 to 1982. Foerster originally joined the Rams football team as a walk-on before earning a scholarship as a sophomore.

Foerster resigned from the Miami Dolphins on October 9, 2017 after video surfaced of him snorting a white powder.

On August 23, 2019, it was reported that Foerster was hired by the San Francisco 49ers as an assistant coach to help game-planning. The hire was not formally announced nor is Foerster featured on the 49ers' website. In 2021, Foerster was promoted to offensive line coach. In 2022, after Niners offensive/run game coordinator Mike McDaniel left to become the head coach of the Miami Dolphins, Foerster was promoted to McDaniel's former position of run game coordinator.

References

External links
Washington Redskins bio

1961 births
Living people
Baltimore Ravens coaches
Colorado State Rams football players
Colorado State Rams football coaches
Indianapolis Colts coaches
Miami Dolphins coaches
Minnesota Golden Gophers football coaches
Minnesota Vikings coaches
National Football League offensive coordinators
San Francisco 49ers coaches
Sportspeople from Milwaukee
Stanford Cardinal football coaches
Tampa Bay Buccaneers coaches
Washington Redskins coaches